Therates labiatus is a beetles species in the family of Cicindelidae. This species is found in Indonesia, Papua New Guinea, and Solomon Islands.

References

Therates